Quturğan is a village and municipality in the Qusar Rayon of Azerbaijan. It consists of the villages of Quturğan, Arçan, Knarçay, and Əlix and has a population of 757.

References

Populated places in Qusar District